Buck's Rock Performing and Creative Arts Camp is an educational summer camp located in New Milford, Connecticut. The camp was established in 1942 by Dr. Ernst Bulova and his wife Ilse, Austrian educators who had studied under Maria Montessori.

Later history

In 2015, the camp was purchased by Noah Salzman, a former camper, from Mickey and Laura Morris. In 2020, the camp was sold and has become a not-for-profit camp, with alumni Antonia Steinberg serving as President of the board. Former camper and counselor Scott Kraiterman serves as  the camp's current director.

Notable staff and alumni

Ben Cohen, co-founder of Ben & Jerry's
Sadie Dupuis, guitarist and singer in rock band Speedy Ortiz
Kerri Green, actress best known for her roles in The Goonies and Lucas
Paz de la Huerta, actress and model
Erica Jong, novelist, satirist, and poet, known for her 1973 novel Fear of Flying
Myq Kaplan, standup comedian
Nicholas Kaufmann, author of horror fiction, urban fantasy, and adventure fiction
Ellen Kempner, singer and guitarist in Palehound
Elle King, singer and musician
Ezra Koenig, frontman and singer of indie rock band Vampire Weekend
Sasha Martin, author and poet, known for cooking a meal from every country in the world and her National Geographic memoir, Life From Scratch: A Memoir of Food, Family, and Forgiveness 
Matt McGorry, actor in Orange is the New Black.
Ezra Miller, actor in The Perks of Being a Wallflower, Fantastic Beasts and Where to Find Them, and as The Flash in Warner Bros' Justice League
Griffin Newman, actor on The Tick and Search Party
Lionel Shriver, novelist
Henry Sapoznik, musician and music historian specializing in klezmer music.
Dana Wickens, producer and drummer at Earwolf
Jason Zimbler, former child actor (Clarissa Explains It All)

References

External links
 Buck's Rock Performing and Creative Arts Camp official website

New Milford, Connecticut
Summer camps in Connecticut
Tourist attractions in Litchfield County, Connecticut
Buildings and structures in Litchfield County, Connecticut